William Neilson 'Kinnie' McKinnon (6 June 1859 – 14 October 1899) was a Scottish footballer.

Career
McKinnon played his entire domestic football career with Dumbarton which spanned almost 13 seasons.

Honours
Dumbarton
- Scottish Cup: Runners Up 1880–81
- Dumbartonshire Cup: Winners 1884–85
- Glasgow Charity Cup: Runners Up 1881–82;1884–85
- 4 caps for Scotland between 1882 and 1884
- 4 representative caps for Scotch Counties between 1881 and 1883
- 1 representative cap for Dumbartonshire in 1885, scoring one goal
- 2 international trial matches for Scotland in 1881.

References

External links

William McKinnon (Dumbarton Football Club Historical Archive)
London Hearts profile
Scottish Football Historical Archive

1859 births
1899 deaths
Scottish footballers
Scotland international footballers
Association football wingers
Dumbarton F.C. players
People from Bonhill
Footballers from West Dunbartonshire